Narayan Prasad Rajbhandari, professionally known as Chittaranjan Nepali, is a Nepalese writer and historian. He received the first ever Madan Puraskar for  Janaral Bhimsen Thapa Ra Tatkalin Nepal, a biographical book on the life of prime minister Bhimsen Thapa. He writes in Nepali as well as Nepalbhasa.

Early life and education 
Nepali was born on 21 July 1931 (10 Shrawan 1988 BS) to Sardar Medini Prasad Rajbhandari and Kali Nani Rajbhandari. He began his basic education in  Mahabir School founded by Chiniya Lal and Phatte Bahadur Singh which was closed after the imprisonment of the founders. He then joined Juddodaya School and completed his SLC level education from Durbar High School in 2004 BS. He then went to Tri-chandra College for his college education.

Since his childhood, he was friends with Bijaya Malla, Gopal Prasad Rimal, Govinda Bahadur Malla and Shyam Das Vaishnav. His father was friends with the historian Baburam Acharya. His poems and historic articles were published in Sharada magazine.

Initially, he worked for Ministry of Foreign Affairs. Then he was transferred to Home ministry.

He received MA degree in history from Tribhuvan University.

Political career 
In 1997 BS after Shukra Raj Shastri, Dashrath Chand, Ganga Lal Shrestha and Dharma Bhakta Mathema were murdered by the Rana government, he became involved in the politics. He starting putting up anti-Rana pamphlets but he need anonymity for doing so else he could lose his job and even be punished by the government. So, he chose the alias Chhitaranjan Nepali.

Literary career 
Nepali started his career as a poet. His first Nepal Bhasa epic poem Ma Lumanka (Mother's memory) was published in 1950-1951 (2007 BS). He then published Janaral Bhimsen Thapa Ra Tatkalin Nepal with the aid of Nepal Sanskirti Sangh (Nepal Cultural Association) about the life of first prime minister of Nepal, Bhimsen Thapa. He won first ever Madan Puraskar for his prize alongside Satya Mohan Joshi and Balram Joshi.

Personal life 
He is married to Merri Baba Rajbhandari and has 4 children (one son and three daughters).

Awards 
Nepali is recipient of various literary and civil awards. Some of the awards are:
 Madan Puraskar for Janaral Bhimsen Thapa Ra Tatkalin Nepal
 Shrestha Shirpa Puraskar
 Subha Rajya Avishek Padak
 Trishatti Patta - Second
 Durgam Sewa Padak
 Janapad Sewa Padak
 Janapad Dirga Sewa Padak

Bibliography
 Ma Lumanka (Nepal Bhasa epic)
Janaral Bhimsen Thapa Ra Tatkalin Nepal
 Jungabahadurko Katha
 Shree 5 Ranbahadur Shah: Bektitva ra ShasanKal
Parivarik Shadyantra

References

Nepalese male writers
Living people
Madan Puraskar winners
20th-century Nepalese historians
1931 births